Antrim Lower is a barony in County Antrim, Northern Ireland. It is bordered by six other baronies: Antrim Upper to the south; Toome Upper to the south-west; Toome Lower to the west; Kilconway to the north-west; Glenarm Lower to the north-east; and Glenarm Upper to the east. The River Braid flows through this barony.

List of main settlements
Below is a list of settlements in Antrim Lower:

Towns
Ballymena

Villages
Ahoghill
Broughshane
Kells

Hamlets/population centres
Martinstown

List of civil parishes
Below is a list of civil parishes in Antrim Lower:
Ahoghill (partly in baronies of Toome Lower, Toome Upper and Kilconway)
Ballyclug
Connor
Glenwhirry
Racavan
Skerry

References

 
Clandeboye